Daniel Hermansson (born April 3, 1982) is a Swedish professional ice hockey forward, who plays for Storhamar of the Norwegian GET-ligaen. He has previously played with Leksands IF and Brynäs IF in the Swedish Hockey League.

On May 17, 2014, Hermansson made his move to Mora IK permanent from Almtuna IS in agreeing to a two-year contract.

References

External links 

1982 births
Living people
Almtuna IS players
IFK Arboga IK players
Brynäs IF players
Leksands IF players
Mora IK players
Skellefteå AIK players
Storhamar Dragons players
Swedish ice hockey right wingers
Swedish expatriate ice hockey players in Norway
People from Borlänge Municipality
Sportspeople from Dalarna County